Aleksandr Rogov (March 27, 1956 – October 1, 2004) was a Soviet sprint canoer who competed in the mid-1970s. At the 1976 Summer Olympics in Montreal, he won the gold in the C-1 500 m event.

Rogov was born in Moscow.

References
Sports-reference.com profile

1956 births
2004 deaths
Canoeists at the 1976 Summer Olympics
Soviet male canoeists
Olympic canoeists of the Soviet Union
Olympic gold medalists for the Soviet Union
Olympic medalists in canoeing
Russian male canoeists

Medalists at the 1976 Summer Olympics